Morozumi (written: 両角) is a Japanese surname. Notable people with the surname include:

, Japanese general
, Japanese curler
, Japanese curler

See also
Morozumi Range, a mountain range of Antarctica

Japanese-language surnames